The 1999–2000 Iona Gaels men's basketball team represented Iona College during the 1999–2000 NCAA Division I men's basketball season. The Gaels, led second-year by head coach Jeff Ruland, played their home games at the Hynes Athletic Center and were members of the Metro Atlantic Athletic Conference. The Gaels finished second in the MAAC regular season standings, and would go on to win the MAAC Basketball tournament to receive an automatic bid to the 2000 NCAA tournament. As the No. 14 seed in the Midwest region, the Gaels lost to No. 3 seed Maryland in the opening round.

Roster

Schedule and results

|-
!colspan=9 style=| Regular season

|-
!colspan=9 style=| MAAC tournament

|-
!colspan=9 style=| NCAA tournament

Awards and honors
Tariq Kirksay – MAAC Player of the Year

References

Iona Gaels men's basketball seasons
Iona
Iona